Sveinn Arnason (died 1683) was an Icelandic man who was executed for witchcraft. He was the last person executed for witchcraft in Iceland. 

Between 1604 and 1720, there were 120 witch trials in Iceland, 22 of whom resulted in executions (the last of whom took place in 1683). 

Sveinn Arnason was charged with having caused the illness of the dean Sigurdur Jonsson's wife. He was executed by burning at the stake. He was the last person executed for sorcery on Iceland: while Klemus Bjarnason was condemned to death for sorcery in 1692, but his execution never took place.

References

17th-century Icelandic people
Witch trials in Iceland
People executed for witchcraft
1683 deaths